Karlovac is a city in central Croatia. According to the 2021 census, its population was 49.377.

Karlovac is the administrative centre of Karlovac County.

Name
The city was named after its founder, Charles II, Archduke of Austria. The  German name Karlstadt or Carlstadt ("Charlestown") has undergone translation into other languages: in Hungarian it is known as Károlyváros, in Italian as Carlovizza, in Latin as Carolostadium, and in Kajkavian and Slovene as Karlovec.

History
The Austrians built Karlovac from scratch in 1579 in order to strengthen their southern defences against Ottoman encroachments. The establishment of a new city-fortress was a part of the deal between the Protestant nobility of Inner Austria and the archduke Charles II of Austria. In exchange for their religious freedom the nobility agreed to finance the building of a new fortress against the Ottoman Empire. It was founded as a six-pointed star fortress built on the Zrinski estate near the old town of Dubovac at the confluence of the Kupa and Korana rivers. As the city later expanded, the urban area reached as far as the Mrežnica and Dobra rivers.  The star shape can still be seen around the town. It was originally known as Karlstadt ("Charles's Town" in German), after the ruling family, upon whose orders construction began on 13 July 1579. The architect of the city was Matija Gambon, whilst work on the new fortress was supervised by George Khevenhüller. It was intentionally built on terrain exposed to flooding and disease from unhealthy water, with the intent to hamper the Turkish advance.

The fortress itself was largely complete by September 1580, while moats and ramparts were finished later, between 1582 and 1589. The first church (of the Holy Trinity) was built in the central square in 1580, but all of the city buildings burned down in the fire of 1594. By 1610, moats and ramparts were repaired, and houses were rebuilt.

As a military outpost of the Habsburg monarchy, Karlovac was the site of the trial and execution of the best-known leader of the rebel Uskoks from the coastal fort of Senj, Ivan Vlatković. He was executed in Karlovac on 3 July 1612 as an example to his troops who were creating difficulties for the Habsurgs by their piracy against Venetian shipping on the Adriatic Sea, and by marauding raids into the Ottoman hinterland. In 1615 their piracy went so far as creating an open war between Venice and Austria. When the Treaty of Paris (ratified in Madrid) was concluded in 1617, bringing an end to the war between Venice and the Habsburgs, under the terms of the treaty the Uskok families were forcibly removed from Senj and disbanded into the hinterland, most notably in the Žumberak hills near Karlovac.

The forces of the Ottoman Empire laid siege to Karlovac seven times, the last time in 1672, but failed to occupy it. The plague epidemic of 1773 also afflicted the city, killing almost half the population of the time.

Meanwhile, the fort was becoming too crowded for the city's expanding population and the Military Frontier government could not allow for its further growth. On 6 December 1693 the city received some limited self-government.

After the Treaty of Karlowitz (1699) and the Ottomans withdrawal, Karlstadt was of less military significance. By the end of the 18th century, the town was a major marketplace for wheat, corn, salt, timber and tobacco, and the source of supply for the Austrian army in Austro-Turkish Wars.

Queen Maria Theresa, after long insistence from the Croatian Diet, restored the towns of Karlovac and Rijeka (Fiume) to the Croatian crownland on 9 August 1776. Maria Theresa was also responsible for the founding of Gymnasium Karlovac, and later King Joseph II reaffirmed it as a free town with an official charter in 1781. This allowed the citizens to expand the city and exploit the potential of being at the crossroads of paths from the Pannonian plains to the Adriatic coast. The town blossomed in the 18th and 19th centuries with the development of roads to the seaside and waterways along the Kupa River. The construction of the Zidani Most-Zagreb-Sisak railway line in 1861, however, marked the end of the era of Karlovac as a major trade and transport center.

In the late 19th and early 20th century, Karlovac was a district capital in the Zagreb County of the Kingdom of Croatia-Slavonia within the Austro-Hungarian Empire.

20th century
Karlovac suffered damage during the Croatian War of Independence (1991–1995). The southern sections of the city found themselves close to the front lines between the Republic of Croatia and the Republic of Serbian Krajina, with shelling devastating the neighborhoods of Turanj, Kamensko, as well as parts of Mekušje, Mala Švarča and Logorište. The city center, the city hall, and numerous other buildings also suffered damage. It was also the site of the Korana bridge killings.

The Karlovac City Museum has transformed the old Austrian military barracks of Turanj into a museum exhibition dedicated to the military history of Karlovac and in particular, through the exhibited weapons, of the Croatian War of Independence. A ticket for this site is also valid for City Museum, Galerija Vjekoslave Karas and Dubovac Castel.

Until the early 2000s, Karlovac's main industry consisted of brewing the beer "Karlovačko", produced by Karlovačka pivovara. By 2007, the rapidly growing firearms manufacturer HS Produkt had become the city's largest private employer. HS Produkt is arguably best known as the designer and manufacturer of the HS2000 pistol, sold in the United States as the Springfield Armory XD.

On 22 October 2016 Croatia's first freshwater aquarium, and the biggest in that part of Europe, named Aquatika was opened in Karlovac.

Description

Croatians know Karlovac as grad parkova (the city of parks) and grad na četiri rijeke (the town on four rivers) for its numerous green areas and four rivers, of which Mrežnica, Korana, and Kupa flow through built-up areas, and Dobra is a few kilometers outside the city centre. A documentary film made by Dušan Vukotić in 1979 on the occasion of the 400th anniversary of the founding of the city plays much on that theme, and shows pictures of happy bathers on the Korana's Fogina beach (Foginovo kupalište) in the city centre.

One of the rarer trees found in the parks is the Ginkgo biloba, which local primary school children are taken out to see as part of their classes on nature and society. Most of the parks are planted in the former trenches dug around the old military fort that were once filled with water as an added layer of protection from the marauding Ottoman armies. One part of the city centre maintains the name of Šanac ('trench') after the old trenches which preserve the old hexagonal form of the historic centre.

Demographics

According to the 2011 census, Karlovac municipality had a total of 55,705 inhabitants. 49,140 of its citizens were Croats (88.21%), 4,460 were Serbs (8.01%), 250 were Bosniaks (0.45%), 237 were Albanians (0.43%), 72 were ethnic Macedonians (0.13%), 49 were Montenegrins (0.09%), and the rest were other ethnicities.

Population by religion in 2011 was following: 45,876 Roman Catholics (82.36%), 3,866 Orthodox Christians (6.94%), 2,806 Atheists (5.04%), 705 Muslims (1.27%), 488 Agnostics (0.88%), and others.

Much of the population of Karlovac has changed since the beginning of the 1991–95 Croatian War of Independence, with numerous families of Croatian Serbs fleeing and being replaced by people who were themselves displaced from parts of Croatia that were held by rebel Serbs during the war (such as from the town of Slunj), as well as by families of Bosnian Croats who started arriving during the war. The migration outflow was mostly towards Serbia, the Republika Srpska entity in Bosnia and Herzegovina, and to countries of Western Europe, North America and Australia.

Settlements
The list of settlements included in the administrative area of the city of Karlovac includes:

 Banska Selnica, population 90
 Banski Moravci, population 68
 Blatnica Pokupska, population 31
 Brezova Glava, population 135
 Brežani, population 129
 Brođani, population 141
 Cerovac Vukmanićki, population 902
 Donja Trebinja, population 22
 Donje Mekušje, population 207
 Donji Sjeničak, population 69
 Gornja Trebinja, population 169
 Gornje Stative, population 385
 Gornji Sjeničak, population 150
 Goršćaki, population 119
 Husje, population 176
 Ivančići Pokupski, population 11
 Ivanković Selo, population 25
 Ivošević Selo, population 7
 Kablar, population 122
 Karasi, population 50
 Karlovac, population 46,833
 Klipino Brdo, population 14
 Kljaić Brdo, population 18
 Knez Gorica, population 111
 Kobilić Pokupski, population 43
 Konjkovsko, population 6
 Koritinja, population 113
 Ladvenjak, population 382
 Lipje, population 48
 Luka Pokupska, population 360
 Mahićno, population 522
 Manjerovići, population 32
 Okić, population 64
 Popović Brdo, population 224
 Priselci, population 96
 Rečica, population 538
 Ribari, population 108
 Skakavac, population 233
 Slunjska Selnica, population 78
 Slunjski Moravci, population 85
 Šebreki, population 0
 Šišljavić, population 457
 Tušilović, population 631
 Tuškani, population 216
 Udbinja, population 63
 Utinja, population 5
 Vodostaj, population 504
 Vukmanić, population 207
 Vukoder, population 1043
 Zadobarje, population 373
 Zagraj, population 63
 Zamršje, population 167

Culture
Karlovac Music School, one of the oldest educational music institutions from this part of Europe (established on 1 December 1804), is the home of Karlovac Piano Festival. Karlovac Piano Festival (founded in 2013) is typically held in mid-summer, and consists of master classes with renowned piano pedagogues as well as Karlovac International Piano Competition. Music school also hosts International guitar school, while in Karlovac theatre Zorin dom Croatian Flute Academy is traditionally held, so during summer months Karlovac is center of young artists of Europe. In the 20th century, Karlovac was a breeding ground for young rock bands, most notably Elektroni in the 1960s and Nužni Izlaz, Prije svega disciplina, Duhovna pastva and Lorelei in the 1970s and the 1980s. The city of Karlovac has memorial-sites dedicated to Croatian veterans of the nation's Homeland War. and opened the Homeland War Museum in Turanj in 2019.

Twin towns – sister cities

Karlovac is twinned with:
 Alessandria, Italy
 Erzsébetváros (Budapest), Hungary
 Kansas City, United States
 Kragujevac, Serbia
 Vukovar, Croatia

Gallery

See also
List of people from Karlovac County
List of people from Karlovac
Karlovac 10K
NK Mostanje

Notable people

For a complete list of people from Karlovac, see List of people from Karlovac County.
 Boris Magaš, architect
 Josip Vaništa, painter
 Ivanka Boljkovac, opera singer
 Zrinka Cvitešić, actress
 Vlado Kalember, singer
 Vjekoslav Karas, painter
 Alfred Krupa (1915-1989), painter
 Gustav Krklec, writer
 Ana Vidović, classical guitarist
Viktor Vidović, classical guitarist
Krešimir Klarić, organist and composer
 Slavko Mihalić, poet
 Davor Gobac, singer
 Danijela Trbović, TV host
 Dejan Jaković, Canadian footballer of Serbian descent
 Jelena Popović, Serbian handball player, World Championship silver medalist
 Maksimilijan Vrhovac (1752–1827), Catholic bishop
 Većeslav Holjevac (1917–1970), Partisan
 Ivan Ribar (1881–1968), politician
 Gajo Petrović (1927–1993), marxist theorist
 Radoslav Lopašić (1835–1893), historian
 Dejan Lovren, Croatian footballer
 Paulina Matijević (1856–1926), benefactress
 Dušan Dančuo (1922–2009), singer
 Đorđe Petrović (born 1933), painter
 Slavko Goldstein (1928–2017), publisher, historian and politician
 Đuro Zatezalo (1931–2017), historian
 Jelka Glumičić (born 1941), human rights activist

References

Notes

Bibliography

External links

 Municipal website
 Tourist information - Karlovac
 Tourist information - Karlovac County
 Interactive town map
 Karlovački Tjednik - Local weekly newspaper
 Pictures of Karlovac
 

 
Cities and towns in Croatia
Populated places in Karlovac County
Zagreb County (former)
16th-century establishments in Croatia
Populated places established in 1579
1579 establishments in Europe